Claude Alphonse Simard  (July 9, 1943 – September 15, 2014) was a Canadian painter born in Quebec City, Quebec. Simard's works depicted garden scenes, landscapes, still lifes and the human figure in a bright and boldly colored manner.

Biography 
Born in Quebec City, Simard studied graphic design at the Ontario College of Art, in Toronto (1962-1966). While still a student in his final year he served as an apprentice with the British Motors Corporation's graphic design department in Birmingham, England (1965). In 1966 he became head of Communications and Design for Simons' in Quebec City. In 1972 he was responsible for the redesigning of Simons' Sainte-Foy store. In 1973 he founded the Communikart design group and worked on corporate identity projects, book publishing, advertising, environmental graphics and exhibition design till 1984. He also designed over a dozen books for the Quebec Museum; and was a consultant for the Quebec government. In 1979 he was also involved in designing for Parks Canada. He became vice-dean of the Faculty of Arts at Laval University, then in 1975-1981, taught part-time at the School. He was a Professor, University of Laval (1984–2001).

Honours 
 Founding member of Quebec Graphic Designers Society (1974) and author of Society's Code of Ethics (Bd. of Dirs. 1974-1976)
 NY Soc. of Illustrators (1977)
 Elected Royal Canadian Academy of Arts, (1983) (Council Mbr. 1984- 1987)

Portfolio 
 Over 60 silk screen prints editioned since 1975
 Card editions by Unicef, Hallmark, L'Imagerie and Cartes Pôle Nord
 postage stamps for Canada Post 1983 and 1987
 Major mural commissions for Parks Canada, Esso, City of Sainte-Foy
 Artist Garden (Jardin Bon Accueil) subject of several major articles and TV shows

Exhibitions 
35 solo exhibitions since 1974, of which:
 Paris Show at L'Orangerie de Bagatelle, 1991
 Montreal, Galerie Walter Klinkhoff, 1986, 1988, 1993, 1997
 Calgary, Masters Gallery, 1992, 1995, 2000
 Toronto, Roberts Gallery, 1996, 1999, 2000
 Québec City, Galerie Perreault, 2011
 "Painting Happiness": Claude A. Simard Retrospective, Centre d’interprétation historique de Sainte-Foy, Quebec City, 2016

Bibliography 
 Arthur Steven (1985) "Claude A. Simard". Alumnus (OCA Alumni Assoc.), Spring, 1985 (5 photos)
 André Juneau (1991) "Claude A. Simard". Presses de L'U.L., 1991, 103p.
 Claude A. Simard (1999) "Jardins Passions". 111p.
 Claude A. Simard (2011) "Inspiration". 127p.

References

External links 
 Artist's Website : claudeasimard.com

1943 births
2014 deaths
Artists from Quebec City
Canadian male painters
Members of the Royal Canadian Academy of Arts
Academic staff of Université Laval
20th-century Canadian painters
21st-century Canadian painters
20th-century Canadian male artists
21st-century Canadian male artists